= ASX Research =

ASX Research is an online aviation and aerospace research publication focused on aviation safety, accident investigation, aerospace science, human factors, aviation history, and related subjects.

ASX Research publishes research and analysis concerning aviation, aerospace, and related scientific subjects. The publication is registered with the ISSN International Centre as ASX research journal and database under ISSN 3068-3351.

== History ==
ASX Research's historical background includes the aviation publishing work of Albert Clark, whose professional contributions appeared in AirForces Monthly in November 2012. Clark subsequently authored and photographed aviation articles for The Aviationist, including “NOAA’s Hurricane Hunters Ready to Face the 2021 Hurricane Season,” published on May 21, 2021. ASX Research developed into its present form in 2021.

The publication's catalog includes aviation research dating to 2018, including The Impossible Turn, with subsequent works addressing flight simulation, aviation safety, aircraft systems, and other aerospace subjects.

== Publication and indexing ==
ASX Research is registered with the ISSN International Centre under ISSN 3068-3351.

Works published by ASX Research are also deposited in external scholarly repositories, where individual publications receive persistent digital object identifiers (DOIs).

ASX Research publications have also been cited in peer-reviewed academic literature.

== Research topics ==
ASX Research publishes work covering aviation safety, human factors, aircraft systems, flight simulation, aviation history, aerospace technology, and related areas of aviation and aerospace research.

Individual publications address subjects ranging from national airspace infrastructure and airport modernization to flight operations, safety analysis, and aerospace systems.

== Selected publications ==
Examples of works published by ASX Research include:

- The Impossible Turn
- Next-Gen Flight Education: MSFS and the Future of Simulation-Based Pilot Training
- Building the Philippine Sky: Modernizing the National Airspace System and the Airports That Sustain It
